CCI (Cascade Cartridge Inc.), based in Lewiston, Idaho, manufactures rimfire ammunition, centerfire handgun ammunition, and primers for reloaders and industrial power loads. CCI made the first mini-mag rimfire ammunition in 1963, and in 1975 developed the Stinger, a high velocity .22 Long Rifle product. Today, CCI makes a wide range of rimfire and snake shot ammunition.

History
CCI was founded by Dick Speer (brother of Vernon Speer, who founded Speer Bullets) in the early 1950s. Arvid Nelson was a partner in the business. The firm's first shipment was part of a defense contract to make primers using chlorate FA-70. CCI later moved on to much safer formulas for sporting ammunition. CCI provided the first reliable supply of primers for hobby reloaders.

As of February 2015, it was a subsidiary of Vista Outdoor, a spinoff of Alliant Techsystems. As of the same date, CCI employed about 1,100 people.

CCI purchased 17 acres of land next to the Lewiston Gun Club. When the gun club moved, CCI purchased that land as well. As of 2020, CCI's plant was still located on this land.

Product lines
In 1975, CCI engineers completed development of the first "hyper-velocity" .22 long rifle ammunition. This ammunition became known as the "CCI Stinger."

In early 2020, CCI introduced 14 new products.

CCI/Speer sells the Gold Dot line, component bullets, and handgun ammunition using a bonded copper-plated hollow point bullet. Plated bullets were originally sold only for handloading as a cheap substitute for jacketed bullets.

CCI sells the MeatEater line of hunting ammunition for small game. CCI partnered with Steven Rinella of MeatEater to produce and market this product line. The MeatEater line of ammunition includes Copper-22, Mini-Mag, and Maxi-Mag variants.

In 2023, CCi introduced Clean-22 Hyper Velocity ammunition; this adds to their line of polymer-coated rimfire ammunition. Polymer coatings significantly reduce lead fouling in barrels.

References

External links
Official website

Lewiston, Idaho
Companies based in Idaho
Companies established in the 1950s
Firearm manufacturers of the United States
Ammunition manufacturers
Alliant Techsystems
1950s establishments in Idaho